Herrmannstadt is a common misspelling of Hermannstadt that is the German name for the following cities:

Sibiu in Transylvania/Sibiu County (Romania).
Heřmanovice in Moravia/Okres Bruntál (Czech Republic).

de:Hermannstadt